was a town in Kawanuma District, Fukushima Prefecture, Japan.

On November 1, 2005, Kawahigashi was merged into the expanded city of Aizuwakamatsu.

External links
 Aizuwakamatsu official website 

Dissolved municipalities of Fukushima Prefecture
Aizuwakamatsu